Waterloo is a town in Seneca County, New York, United States. The population was 7,338 at the 2020 census. The town  and its major community are named after Waterloo, Belgium, where Napoleon was defeated.

There is also a village called Waterloo, the primary county seat of Seneca County. The Town of Waterloo is situated on the western border of the county, east of Geneva.

History 

The area was the domain of the Seneca tribe and Cayuga tribe, who were visited in the 17th century by Jesuit missionaries.  The Sullivan Expedition passed through the area in 1779 to destroy the natives and their villages.  After the war, the area was in the Central New York Military Tract, reserved for veterans.

The region was first settled circa 1800.

The town was formed from the Town of Junius in 1829.

Geography 
According to the United States Census Bureau, the town has a total area of 21.8 square miles (56.5 km2), of which 21.7 square miles (56.2 km2) is land and 0.2 square mile (0.4 km2)  (0.78%) is water.

The western town line is the border of Ontario County, New York, and part of the southern town boundary is Seneca Lake and the Seneca River/Cayuga-Seneca Canal.

The New York State Route 5/U.S. Route 20 concurrency is a major east–west highway in Waterloo. New York State Route 96 is a highway that turns southward at Waterloo village.

Demographics 

As of the census of 2010, there were 7,642 people, 3,118 households, and 2,008 families residing in the town. The population density was 352.2 people per square mile (136.0/km2). The racial makeup of the town was 95.9% White, 1.5% Black or African American, 0.1% Native American, 0.3% Asian, 0.0% Pacific Islander, 0.4% from other races, and 1.8% from two or more races. Hispanic or Latino of any race were 2.5% of the population.

There were 3,118 households, out of which 26.1% had children under the age of 18 living with them, 44.6% were married couples living together, 13.2% had a female householder with no husband present, and 35.6% were non-families. 28.8% of all households were made up of individuals, and 11.9% had someone living alone who was 65 years of age or older. The average household size was 2.35 and the average family size was 2.83.

In the town, the population was spread out, with 23.5% under the age of 20, 5.7% from 20 to 24, 23.1% from 25 to 44, 29.5% from 45 to 64, and 18.2% who were 65 years of age or older. The median age was 43.3 years. For every 100 females, there were 92.3 males. For every 100 females age 18 and over, there were 89.9 males.

The median income for a household in the town was $43,527, and the median income for a family was $53,625. Males had a median income of $39,743 versus $30,211 for females. The per capita income for the town was $23,147. About 7.6% of families and 10.2% of the population were below the poverty line, including 11.7% of those under age 18 and 4.6% of those age 65 or over.

Housing
There were 3,386 housing units at an average density of 156.0 per square mile (60.2/km2); 7.9% of housing units were vacant.

There were 3,118 occupied housing units in the town, of which 2,179 were owner-occupied units (69.9%), while 939 were renter-occupied (30.1%). The homeowner vacancy rate was 1.2% of total units. The rental unit vacancy rate was 10.1%.

Schools

Public schools 
Skoi-Yase School is a public school that teaches Grades Pre-School to Grade 2. Its enrollment is about 420 students. The current principal is Liz Springer.
Lafayette Intermediate School is a public school that teaches Grades 3–5. Its enrollment is about 344 students. The current principal is Sally Covert.
Main Street Multiage School is a public school that teaches Grades K-5. Its enrollment is about 117 students. The current principal is Wendy Doyle. The school was previously the Border City Elementary School until it moved to the former middle school building.
Waterloo Middle School is a public school that teaches Grades 6–8. Its enrollment is about 546 students. The current principal is Michael Ferrara.
Waterloo High School - Grades 9–12. Its enrollment is about 608 students. The current principal is Mary Thomas-Madonna.

Private schools 
Fayette Mennonite School is a private mennonite school that teaches Grades 1–8. Its enrollment is about 50 students. The current head teacher is Elizabeth Zimmerman.

Until 2005, St. Mary's School operated as a private Roman Catholic school in Waterloo from prekindergarten to Grade 8. After undergoing financial difficulties, it merged with St. Patrick's school in Seneca Falls, New York to form St. John Bosco School in 2005.

Communities and locations in the Town of Waterloo 
Border City – A hamlet near the western town line and Geneva. (See also Serven below.)
Dobbins Corner – A hamlet at the west town line on County Road 112.
East Geneva – A hamlet also near the western town boundary on US-20/NY-5.
Packwood Corners – A hamlet on US-20/NY-5, on the southern town line.
Parr Harbour – A location west of Waterloo village on US-20/NY-5.
Seneca Lake State Park – A state park in the southwestern corner of the town.
Seneca Meadows – New York State's largest active landfill
Serven – A location overlapping the portions of Border City and East Geneva northeast of the Northern Terminus of 96A. Extends between 96A and Packwood Road along US-20/NY-5.
Waterloo – The Village of Waterloo on US-20/NY-5, at the southern town line, partly in the Town of Fayette.

Notable people 
Louise Blanchard Bethune, architect
Tom Coughlin, former New York Giants and Jacksonville Jaguars' head coach.
Mike McLaughlin, NASCAR driver.
Charles E. Stuart, U.S. Representative and Senator from Michigan.
George Bradshaw Kelly, U.S. Representative for New York's 38th congressional district, from 1937 to 1939.
Agnes Woodward, professional whistler, born in Waterloo

References

External links 
Town of Waterloo (official website)
Waterloo Library & Historical Society

Towns in New York (state)
 
1829 establishments in New York (state)
Towns in Seneca County, New York